New Theatre or New Theater may refer to:

United Kingdom
 Hull New Theatre, a theatre in Kingston-upon-Hull, England
 Lisle's Tennis Court, Lincoln's Inn Fields, London, a former theatre known as the New Theatre in its first incarnation from 1695
 New Theatre, Cardiff, one of the main theatres in Cardiff, Wales
 New Theatre Oxford, the main commercial theatre in Oxford, England
 Noël Coward Theatre, London, known as the New Theatre from 1903 to 1972
 Nottingham New Theatre, the University of Nottingham's student-run theatre company and playhouse in Nottingham, England
 Theatre Royal, Bury St Edmunds, Suffolk, formerly the New Theatre

United States

New York City
 Century Theatre (Central Park West) (1909–1931), formerly New Theatre
 New Theatre (off-Broadway) (1964–1974)
 Park Theatre (Manhattan) (1798–1848), formerly New Theatre
 Theatre on Nassau Street (1732–1758)

Other states
 Chestnut Street Theatre, Philadelphia, Pennsylvania, formerly New Theatre
 Holliday Street Theater, historical theatre in colonial Baltimore
 New Theatre (Fort Smith, Arkansas), historic theatre building

Other countries
 Det Ny Teater (The New Theatre), an established theatre in Copenhagen, Denmark
 New Theatre, the former name of the resident theatre group at what is now Lensovet Theatre, Leningrad, Russia
 New Theatre, Dublin, Ireland
 New Theatre, Melbourne, Australia, 1970s theatre featuring Aboriginal actors such as Jack Charles
 New Theatre, Sydney, Australia
 New Theatre (Plzeň), Czech Republic
 Nya Teatern, former name of Swedish Theatre (Stockholm)
 Nya Teatern, former name of Mindre teatern in Stockholm, Sweden
 Werburgh Street Theatre, Dublin, Ireland, the first Dublin theatre (1637)

Other uses 
 New Theatre (magazine), a magazine dedicated to the dramatic arts, published by the New Theatre League in New York in the 1930s

See also
 New Theatre Comique, 19th-century theatre in New York
 New Theatre League (disambiguation)
 New Theatre Quarterly, an academic journal
 New Theatre Royal Lincoln, in Lincoln, England
 New Theatres, Calcutta, India